Arthur Daniel Flannery (born March 10, 1944) is an American actor from Evanston, Illinois. He has played roles in several movies, short films, and T.V. shows from a variety of genres including drama, action, and thriller. His filmography includes The Straight Story (1999), and Contagion (2011) and T.V. series such as Empire (2015 TV series) and Boss (2011-2012).

Early life and education
Flannery was born in Webster, South Dakota, to Arthur James Flannery, and Marcella Margaret Flannery. He completed his Bachelor of Business Administration in 1967, from Creighton University, Omaha, Nebraska.

Career
After graduating, Flannery went on to become a teacher at the Blessed Sacrament School in Omaha, where he stayed until 1971. He later moved to Chicago, Illinois where he worked as Area Supervisor for Santa Cruz imports. It was only in 1981 that Flannery began his acting career. He has played many dramatic roles on the big screen including T.V. movies such as The President's Man: A Line in the Sand that aired on CBS. His talents have been used in several 2000s films like the Nicolas Cage Dramedy, The Weather Man and The Express: The Ernie Davis Story with Dennis Quaid. Flannery most recently acted in the FOX drama series Empire. He is also an educator, teaching acting and English as a foreign language for over thirty years. Flannery is a member of the Screen Actors Guild‐American Federation of Television and Radio Artists (SAG-AFTRA).

Filmography

Selected performances
Monologue from a theatrical adaptation of To Kill a Mockingbird
Quarter 'Til Two (Short Film)

References

American male film actors
Living people
1944 births
People from Webster, South Dakota